Lucas Paul de los Santos Ruiz Díaz (born 26 July 2001) is a Uruguay professional footballer who plays as a midfielder for Defensor Sporting in the Uruguayan Primera División.

Career
Lucas de los Santos played locally in his hometown of Paysandú before arriving in the capital to sign for Defensor Sporting and came through their youth ranks. He made his first team debut on 5 October, 2021 in the 1-0 defeat of Central Español in the Uruguayan Segunda División. Following their promotion in the 2021 promotion play offs, ‭de los Santos made his debut in the Uruguayan Primera Division on 5 February, 2022 against Liverpool‭ at the Estadio Luis Franzini.

References

External links
 

2001 births
Living people
Uruguayan footballers
Association football midfielders
Defensor Sporting players
Uruguayan Segunda División players 
Uruguayan Primera División players
Sportspeople from Paysandú